Robert Sands may refer to:
Robert Sands (artist) (born 1943), American artist
Rob Sands, American billionaire, CEO of Constellation Brands
Robert Sands (conductor) (1828–1872), conductor of the Mormon Tabernacle Choir
Bobby Sands (1954–1981), member of the Irish Republican Army
Robert Charles Sands (1799–1832), American writer
Robert Sands (American football) (born 1989), football player